was a Japanese light novel and game scenario author from Ibaraki Prefecture, Japan. He was well known for being the author of The Familiar of Zero light novels and visual novels by Frontwing.

Biography 
On February 11, 1972, he was born in Hitachi, Ibaraki. He graduated in Department of Political Science Division II, School of Political Science and Economics, Meiji University. In July 2011, he revealed on Media Factory's website that he had advanced stage cancer that was discovered in February of that year and which was untreatable at the time, which affected his work on the final two volumes of Zero no Tsukaima. After an unrelated gallstone surgery, the cancerous growth was found to have shrunk allowing surgery to take place in early August 2011. On November 1, 2011, he was invited to the event of "Amazon.co.jp 10th Anniversary", and he was inducted to a hall of fame in Japanese Books section, Amazon.co.jp 10th Anniversary. He was later readmitted to the hospital in December 2011, and had another surgery in November 2012. Yamaguchi died on April 4, 2013 at the age of 41. His funeral was held on April 9. His death was publicly announced on April 11 by his family and publishers.

Works

Light novels (original)

Light novels (novelizations)

Video game scenarios

Recognition
 Inducted into a hall of fame in Japanese Books section, Amazon.co.jp 10th Anniversary (November 1, 2011)

References

External links
 Noboru Yamaguchi's blog 

1972 births
2013 deaths
Japanese writers
Light novelists
Writers from Ibaraki Prefecture
People from Hitachi, Ibaraki